Hotel Saravana Bhavan is the largest South Indian restaurant chain in the world, founded in 1981 in Chennai, Tamil Nadu, India. They operate 33 locations in India (24 in Chennai) and 78 across 22 countries in Southeast Asia, Australia, New Zealand, the Middle East, Europe, and North America.

History
P. Rajagopal opened a tiny grocery shop on the outskirts of the city. In 1992, Rajagopal on his visits to Singapore observed the functioning of the multinational fast food joints like McDonald's and used them as a model.

By the 1990s, the Saravana Bhavan chain spread throughout neighbourhoods in Chennai. In 2000, Saravana Bhavan opened its first branch outside India, in Dubai, with a large number of Indian expatriates. It eventually expanded to several major cities including Paris, Frankfurt, London, New York City, Dallas, Toronto, Stockholm, Doha, and Auckland. While the restaurants have gained popularity among non-Indians, they mostly target the South Asian expatriate population. They are sometimes referred to as "canteen-like joints strictly aimed at Indian expatriates missing a taste of home". It is considered to be a high volume, low margin venture which is labour-intensive. Saravana Bhavan sends workers from India and America to work in their foreign branches. The overseas outlets are run by franchisees.

This famous South Indian restaurant chain currently serves in many countries worldwide, that are:  India, Australia, New Zealand, Malaysia, Oman, Canada, France, Belgium, Germany, Singapore, Bahrain, UAE, United Kingdom, USA, Kuwait, Saudi Arabia, South Africa, Qatar, Hong Kong, Thailand, Netherlands, and Sweden.

Saravana Bhavan in United Kingdom has restaurants in East Ham (Greater London),  Harrow (Greater London), Ilford (East London),  Leicester Square (West End of London),  Southall (West London) and Tooting (South London). The branches of the biggest South Indian restaurant chain in the United Kingdom are mostly known to be situated in London.

See also 
 Udupi restaurants and hotels
 Vegetarian and Vegan Restaurants in Singapore
 List of vegetarian restaurants
 Indians in the New York City metropolitan region

References

External links

Saravana Bhavan as one of the top 50 restaurants in Australia
Saravana Bhavan Stockholm

Vegetarian restaurants in India
Restaurants in Chennai
Restaurants in Delhi
South Indian cuisine
Restaurants established in 1981
Fast-food chains of India
Catering and food service companies of India
Restaurants in India
Indian restaurants outside India
Vegetarian restaurants in Singapore
Restaurant chains in India
Companies based in Chennai
1981 establishments in Tamil Nadu